Emmalocera transecta is a species of snout moth in the genus Emmalocera described by Alfred Jefferis Turner in 1947. It is found in Australia.

References

Moths described in 1947
Emmalocera